Silverstone Heliport  is  north of Buckingham, Buckinghamshire, England and within the mid-east of the Silverstone Circuit motor racing track, formerly RAF Silverstone.

Silverstone Northern Heliport has a CAA Ordinary Licence (Number P874) that allows flights for the public transport of passengers or for flying instruction as authorised by the licensee (Silverstone Circuits Limited). The aerodrome is not licensed for night use.

The world record for the world's busiest airport for one day, was at this site during the 1999 British Grand Prix. There were 4,200 documented aircraft movements (1 movement being a landing or a takeoff) in one day from dawn until dusk. The airfield was fully licensed and used a sophisticated air traffic control service, using six full air traffic control radio frequencies and a continuous message broadcast (ATIS) service, operated by a team of 24 air traffic controllers. This achievement was coordinated completely on a VFR (Visual Flight Rules) basis without the assistance of radar or any other electronic navigation aids.
 
Many flights relate to the annual Grand Prix events but fewer than in 1999 due to improved roads to the venue.

The helipads/short strips are within yards of the southern extent of Northamptonshire (considered the East Midlands), which straddles the course.

References

Airports in England
Heliports in England
Transport in Buckinghamshire
Airports in South East England